Kocur is a surname which means "tomcat" in Polish and Slovak. It is a cognate of the Czech surname Kocour and East Slavic Kotsur.

Kocur may refer to:
 Joe Kocur (born 1964), Canadian ice hockey player
 Kory Kocur (born 1969), Canadian ice hockey player
 Miroslav Kocur, Slovak microbiologist
 Kijewski / Kocur, Polish artists

References

See also
 
 Kotsur

Polish-language surnames
Slovak-language surnames